James Strom Thurmond Jr. (born October 18, 1972) is a former United States Attorney for the District of South Carolina and 2nd Circuit Solicitor. He is one of four children born to long-serving United States Senator Strom Thurmond and Nancy (Moore) Thurmond. His younger brother, Paul, is a former member of the South Carolina Senate. Thurmond graduated from the University of South Carolina in 1995 and University of South Carolina School of Law in 1998. He is the oldest currently living child of Strom Thurmond following the deaths of his older sister Nancy in 1993 and his half-sister Essie in 2013.

Career 
Thurmond was recommended for the position of United States attorney in South Carolina by his father, who was the chair of the Senate Judiciary Committee, the panel that reviewed such appointments. Senator Thurmond claimed his son was "uniquely qualified". At the time, Thurmond Jr. was 28 years old and had been a practicing lawyer for fewer than three years, whereas the average age of the 93 U.S. attorneys was 50, and their average length of legal experience was 22 years. However, the nomination was not contentious, as it was also backed by South Carolina Democrats, including the then-junior U.S. Senator Fritz Hollings. Thurmond served as assistant solicitor for the solicitor's office of the Second Judicial Circuit of South Carolina (1999–2001), as U.S. attorney (2001–2005) and solicitor for the Second Judicial Circuit of South Carolina (2009–2020).

In January 2021, he began private law practice.

References

External links
 

1972 births
Living people
South Carolina state solicitors
United States Attorneys for the District of South Carolina
South Carolina Republicans
University of South Carolina School of Law alumni
21st-century American politicians
Strom Thurmond